The 2022 LIU Sharks men's volleyball team, the first ever LIU men's volleyball team, represented Long Island University Brooklyn in the 2022 NCAA Division I & II men's volleyball season. The Sharks, led by first year head coach Shawn Patchell, played their home games at Steinberg Wellness Center. The Sharks competed as an Independent. However the Sharks will join the newly created Northeast Conference men's volleyball conference in 2023. After a slow start LIU won 9 of their final 10 games to finish a respectable 13–15.

Season highlights
Will be filled in as the season progresses.

Roster

Schedule
TV/Internet Streaming information:
All home games were streamed on NEC Front Row. Most road games were streamed by the schools streaming service.

 *-Indicates conference match.
 Times listed are Eastern Time Zone.

Announcers for televised games
Belmont Abbey: Geffrey Chiles
Belmont Abbey: Geffrey Chiles
Springfield: No commentary
St. Francis: Jake Slebodnick & Sophie Rice
Fairleigh Dickinson: Marc Ernay
Daemen: Joe Kraus
D'Youville: Jamal
Alvernia: No commentary
NJIT: Ira Thor
NJIT: No commentary
Hawai'i: Kanoa Leahey & Ryan Tsuji
Hawai'i: Kanoa Leahey & Ryan Tsuji
Hawai'i: Kanoa Leahey & Ryan Tsuji
D'Youville: No commentary
St. Francis Brooklyn: Marc Ernay
St. Francis: No commentary
UC Santa Barbara: Greg Silver & Katie Spieler
Long Beach State: Bryan Fenley & Mike Sealy
St. Katherine: No commentary
Edward Waters: No commentary
Sacred Heart: Nyala Pendergrass
American International: No commentary
Edward Waters: No commentary
Edward Waters: No commentary
American International: No commentary
St. Francis Brooklyn: No commentary
Sacred Heart: No commentary
Fairleigh Dickinson: No commentary

References

2022 in sports in New York (state)
LIU